The women's 75 kg competition of the weightlifting events at the 2015 Pan American Games in Toronto, Canada, was a competition of women's weightlifting held on July 14, 2015 at the Oshawa Sports Centre. The defending champion was Ubaldina Valoyes from Colombia.

Schedule
All times are Eastern Daylight Time (UTC-4).

Results
6 athletes from five countries took part.

References

External links
Weightlifting schedule

Weightlifting at the 2015 Pan American Games
Pan
Wei